Onychocerus concentricus is a species of beetle in the family Cerambycidae. It was described by Bates in 1862.

References

Anisocerini
Beetles described in 1862